Mudval also spelled as Mudwal is a village near Maski in the Lingasugur taluk of Raichur district in the Indian state of Karnataka. Mudwal is a pre-historic period site. There is a stone village in the village of historical importance. Gold crushers and Iron slags were found in the hill near to the Mudval village.

See also
 Maski
 Hatti
 Mudgal
 Jaladurga
 Raichur
 Districts of Karnataka

References

External links

Villages in Raichur district
Archaeological sites in Karnataka